Señorita Panamá 2018 the 52nd Señorita Panamá pageant selected to the Miss Universe & Miss World. This was the 3rd edition of the renewed Señorita Panama pageant, after Justine Pasek, Miss Universe 2002, and César Anel Rodríguez be named the new directors of the pageant in Panamá. 20 preliminary contestants have been selected from all over Panama and competed for the prestigious crown.

The Señorita Panamá was held at the Roberto Durán Arena, Ciudad de Panamá, Panama, June 7, 2018. About 20 contestants from all over the country competed for the prestigious crown. Señorita Panamá 2017 Laura de Sanctis of Contadora crowned Rosa Montezuma of Comarcas as her successor at the end of the event as the new Señorita Panamá.

Also was selected the "Señorita Panamá Mundo" title, Julianne Brittón Señorita Panamá World 2017 of Taboga crowned her successor at the same night as the same Darelys Santos Señorita Panamá International 2017 of Panamá Norte and Erika Parker Señorita Panamá Earth 2017 of Colón.

Rosa Montezuma Señorita Panamá 2018 competed in Miss Universe 2018 was the 67th Miss Universe pageant, held on 17 December 2018 at IMPACT Arena, Muang Thong Thani in Nonthaburi Province, northern suburb of Bangkok, Thailand. Solaris Barba Señorita Panamá World represented Panama in Miss World 2018 pageant held in China PR placing in the top 12, also  Shirel Ortiz Señorita Panamá International represented Panama in Miss International 2018  in Tokyo, Japan on November 9, 2018, finally Diana Lemos Señorita Panamá Earth represented Panama in Miss Earth 2018.

Final Result

Placements

Special awards

National Costume Selection
This year the contestant, was celebrated in the Viva Panamá gala on June 5, 2018. It is a competition showing the country's wealth embodied in the colorful and fascinating costumes made by Panamenian designers combining the past and present of Panama. The winner costume represent Panamá in Miss Universe 2018 also chose the national costumes for Miss World 2018, Miss International 2018, Miss Earth 2018, Miss United Continents 2018, Reina Hispanoamericana 2018 & Reinado Internacional del Café 2019.

Preliminary Interview
Held on June 6, to Señorita Panamá candidates were qualified in personal interview for the judges.

Judges
Eduardo Cano: Designer. (Panama)
Chris Puesan: Miss Haiti President. (Dominican Republic)
Rita Silvestre: Señorita Panamá for United Continents 2016. (Panama)
Junior Exidio Zelaya: journalist. (Honduras)
María Cecilia Triana de Muñoz: Professional Dancer. (Panama)
José Miguel Guerra: Public relationist. (Panama)
Osmel Sousa: Miss Venezuela President. (Cuba / Venezuela)
María Alejandra Chacón: Co-founder Leotards Panama. 
Luis Ortega: Experts in Beauty Pageants. (Panama)
Sarita Esses: social communicator. (Japan)
Mario Augusto Perez: Architect. (Panama) 
George Wittels: Goldsmith International. (Austria / Venezuela)
Viera Algandona: Producer and Businesswoman. (Panama)

Presentation Show
This Preliminary Competition also called The Runway of the Misses the event was held on 19 April 2018, is the night when the twenty finalists were selected from Señorita Panamá 2018 are presented to the public and press in the Swimsuit and cocktail dress categories.

Official Contestants 
These are the competitors who have been selected this year.

Historical significance
Comarcas won the Señorita Panamá title for the first time.
Herrera won the Señorita Panamá World title for the second time, last time with Marissa Burgos in 1983.
Panamá Centro won the Señorita Panamá International title, last with Daniela Ochoa in 2016.
Isla San José won the Señorita Panamá Earth title for the first time.
Taboga, Los Santos, Panamá Este, Panamá Oeste placed in the top 10 last year.
Isla San José placed for the first time.
 Chiriquí & Panamá Centro placed for the last time in (2016).
Herrera & Veraguas placed for the last time in (2015).
Comarcas placed for the last time in (2013).

Election Schedule
Señorita Panamá World & Señorita Panamá 2018
Thursday April 19 presentation Show.
Tuesday June 5, Best National Costume competition. 
Wednesday June 6, interview with the jury. 
Thursday June 7 Final night, coronation Señorita Panamá  2018.

Candidates Notes
Ayhemeis Henríquez competed in Miss Eco International 2017 where she placed in the top 10.
Andrea Valeria Batista was the carnival queen in Las Tablas in 2015.
Selena Gómez competed in Miss Grand International 2016 but didn't placed.
Rosa Iveth Montezuma is the first indigenous woman to compete for the Señorita Panamá title, and won the competition.

References

External links
Panamá 2018 official website
Señorita Panama

Señorita Panamá
Panama
2018 in Panama